1st Otdelenie Gosudarstvennoy Selektsionnoy Stantsii is a rural locality (a settlement) in Tulunsky District, Russia. The population was 214 as of 2012.

Geography 
The settlement is located 10 km northwest of Tulun (the district's administrative centre) by road. Tulun is the nearest rural locality.

Streets 
 Zernovaya
 Lesnaya 
 Semennaya

References

External links 
 1st Branch of the State Breeding Station on streetvi.ru

Rural localities in Irkutsk Oblast